Zero point may refer to:

Origin (mathematics), a fixed point of reference for a coordinate system
Zero Point (film), an Estonian film
Zero point (photometry), a calibration mechanism for magnitude in astronomy
Zero Point (South Georgia), a point in Possession Bay, South Georgia
Zero Point Interchange,  a cloverleaf interchange in Islamabad, Pakistan, at the intersection of Islamabad Highway, Kashmir Highway and Khayaban-e-Suharwardy
Zero Point railway station, a railway station on the Pakistan–India border
Lingdian (band), sometimes translated in English as Zero Point, a Chinese band
"Zero Point", a song by Tori Amos, released on A Piano: The Collection
Zero Point, a fictional orb of energy in Fortnite Battle Royale

See also 
Zero-point energy, the minimum energy a quantum mechanical system may have
Zero-point field, a synonym for the vacuum state in quantum field theory
Hofstadter zero-point, a special point associated with every plane triangle
Point of origin (disambiguation)
Triple zero (disambiguation)
Point Zero (disambiguation)